2017 World Masters Athletics Indoor Championships is the seventh in a series of World Masters Athletics Indoor Championships (also called World Masters Athletics Championships Indoor, or WMACi). This seventh edition took place in Daegu,

South Korea,

from 19 to 25 March 2017.

This was the first Indoor Championships held in an odd-numbered year, to alternate with the Outdoor Championships that switched to even-numbered years in 2016.

The main venue was Daegu Athletics Promotion Center,

which has a banked indoor track

where the turns are raised to neutralize the centrifugal force of athletes running the curves. This track has no bounce even on the high curves, as is often found in older portable tracks.

Supplemental venues included Civil Life Sports Center, Daegu Stadium Auxiliary Field for throws, and Suseong Family Park for Cross Country.

This Championships was organized by World Masters Athletics (WMA) in coordination with a Local Organising Committee (LOC): Kwon Young (Mayor of Daegu), Daegu Metropolitan City,
Korean Olympic Committee, Korea Association of Athletics Federations and Daegu Sports Council.

A record total of 4,364 athletes from 74 countries competed.

The WMA is the global governing body of the sport of athletics for athletes 35 years of age or older, setting rules for masters athletics competition.

A full range of indoor track and field events were held.

In addition to indoor competition, non-stadia events included Half Marathon,

8K Cross Country, 10K Race Walk, Weight Throw, Hammer Throw, Discus Throw and Javelin Throw.

Controversy
China boycotted this Championships due to political tension with South Korea.

Results
Official daily results are archived at simplyregister.net

Past Championships results are archived at WMA.

Additional archives are available from European Masters Athletics

as a searchable pdf,

and from British Masters Athletic Federation

as a searchable pdf.

USATF Masters keeps a list of American record holders.

Canadian Masters Athletics keeps an archive of Canadian athletes and results at WMA Championships.

Several masters world records were set at this Indoor Championships.

World records for 2017 are from WMA unless otherwise noted.

Women

Men

References

External links

Guide Book

World Masters Athletics Championships
World Masters Athletics Championships
International athletics competitions hosted by South Korea
2017
Masters athletics (track and field) records